Hemilienardia albostrigata is a species of sea snail, a marine gastropod mollusk in the family Raphitomidae.

Description
The length of the shell varies between 3 mm and 8 mm.

The shell is whitish or light yellowish brown, marked on the back of the body whorl with a pure white chalky-looking band, and in some instances with an interrupted band of brown.

This is a pure-white turreted little species, with a conspicuous dorsal squarrose brown spot just below the suture of the body whorl. The whorls are ventricose and ribbed longitudinally, crossed with a few conspicuous lirae. The outer lip is much thickened with large denticles on the inner surface, and the columella is toothed.

It differs from Hemilienardia apiculata (Montrouzier in Souverbie & Montrouzier, 1864) by the presence of a brown spot on the edge of the body whorl.

Distribution
This marine species occurs off New Caledonia and Queensland, Australia

References

 Baird, Cruise " Curaçoa," 1873, p. 434,
 Wiedrick S.G. (2017). Aberrant geomorphological affinities in four conoidean gastropod genera, Clathurella Carpenter, 1857 (Clathurellidae), Lienardia Jousseaume, 1884 (Clathurellidae), Etrema Hedley, 1918 (Clathurellidae) and Hemilienardia Boettger, 1895 (Raphitomidae), with the description of fourteen new Hemilienardia species from the Indo-Pacific. The Festivus. special issue: 2-45.

External links
 

albostrigata
Gastropods described in 1873
Gastropods of Australia